San Juan High School is located in Blanding, Utah, United States. The school is in the San Juan School District, and serves grades 9–12. The schools colors are royal blue and gold. The mascot is a blue and gold horse named, Spirit who replaced Oat 'N Bow in 2017.

As a 3a school, San Juan High School is the largest high school in the San Juan County, Utah. Each graduating class has approx. 100 students.

Clubs and sports 
San Juan High School offers a variety of clubs and sports.

The clubs include: 

 Art Club
 Band
 Blue Mountain Unity Club (Navajo Heritage)
 Choir
 Drama
 Educational Talent Search
 FBLA
 French
 FFA
 FMP
 Geek Squad
 Honor Society
 HOSA
 Hope Squad    
 Interact     
 Science Olympiad
 Skills USA       
 Sterling Scholar
 Student Council
 Upward Bound
 Quiz Bowl

Sports and athletics include:

 Baseball
 Boys Basketball 
 Boys Soccer
 Boys Tennis 
 Cheerleading
 Cross Country
 Drill Team
 Football
 Girls Basketball
 Girls Soccer
 Girls Tennis
 Golf 
 Softball
 Track & Field
 Volleyball
 Wrestling

References

External links

San Juan School District

Public high schools in Utah
Schools in San Juan County, Utah